Lord Norton may refer to
Charles Adderley, 1st Baron Norton (1814–1905), government minister
Philip Norton, Baron Norton of Louth (1951– ), constitutional expert